The Pacific Transfer Building is an historic building in Victoria, British Columbia, Canada.  It was owned by The Pacific Transfer Company, a company that offered express deliveries within the City of Victoria and was key in the distribution of goods arriving by ship and rail.

See also
 List of historic places in Victoria, British Columbia

References

External links
 

Buildings and structures in Victoria, British Columbia